Calanasan, officially the Municipality of Calanasan, , (formerly known as Bayag, meaning "slow") is a 1st class municipality in the province of Apayao, Philippines. According to the 2020 census, it has a population of 12,550 people.

Calanasan is the source of the Apayao River which empties into the South China Sea and is the only navigable river in Apayao.

Geography

According to the Philippine Statistics Authority, the municipality has a land area of  constituting  of the  total area of Apayao.

The town's topography or slope is predominantly rugged and mountainous with sporadic flood plains and plateaus. The municipality cradles the larger part of the Apayao-Abulog watershed area as the main source of streams that fills the mighty river which originates from the municipality.

Calanasan has two pronounced seasons, the dry and the wet seasons. The dry season starts in the latest part of December and ends in the middle part of June. The wet season starts in July and ends in the middle part of December. The hottest month is May and rainfall is heaviest in August while strong typhoons usually occur within the period of August to October and the December used to be the coolest month.

Barangays
Calanasan is politically subdivided into 20 barangays. These barangays are headed by elected officials: Barangay Captain, Barangay Council, whose members are called Barangay Councilors. All are elected every three years.

Climate

Demographics

In the 2020 census, Calanasan had a population of 12,550.

Calanasan is dominated by the Isnag people, living with them are the Ilocanos, Igorots and Kalingas. The main languages spoken are the Isnag and the Ilocano.

Economy 

Economic activity in the municipality is based on agricultural production like farming and fishing and livelihood activities like basketry, soft broom making and furniture making.

The municipality has no level lands for extensive rice production except in the northern part of the municipality. Its produce include coffee, corn, root crops, peanuts and other legumes, banana, pineapple and some vegetables.

Government
Calanasan, belonging to the lone congressional district of the province of Apayao, is governed by a mayor designated as its local chief executive and by a municipal council as its legislative body in accordance with the Local Government Code. The mayor, vice mayor, and the councilors are elected directly by the people through an election which is being held every three years.

Elected officials

Tourism
The town has vast variety of wild flora and fauna which contributes to its eco-tourism potential. The town is surrounded with virgin forests, cascading waterfalls, and clear rivers.

Potential tourist attractions include:

 Apayao River — Poblacion
 Girgirra’ Falls — Ninoy Aquino
 Ziwanan River — Cadaclan
 Maxibab Falls — Santa Filomena
 Carmella Falls — Eva
 Pisong Lake
 Danao Lake — Sitio Danao, Poblacion
 Purit Cave
 Bantay Malingudu — Poblacion
 Agamata National Park and Wildlife Sanctuary — near the Ilocos Norte boundary, was established in the remote area of sharp peaks and plateaus. This undeveloped area, with pine stands, lush vegetation and mossy forest, affords a panoramic view of Ilocos Norte and Laoag City on the west. It is ideal for hiking, camping, nature tripping and bird watching.
 Blue Haven
 Mount Kilang

Festivals
 Sinandila/Sinursor Festival and Pippiru' Festival (Boat Racing) — celebrated every third week of March
 Calanasan Town Fiesta — celebrated every March which is coming together of the people of Calanasan, The month-long activities highlights the Agro-Industrial and trade fair which showcase the different products of Calanasan and Highlights also the Sports fest, Calanasan got Talent and the Street Dance Competition together with most awaited part the "Search for Miss Dam-ag naya Calanasan".
 Say-Am Festival — is a feast featuring and ushering the traditional way of Isnag's thanksgiving to the Higher Supreme unseen being called "Alawagan" executed and commence through rituals spiced with pep songs, native chants and dances called the "Talip" and "Tad-do". The holding and celebration of Say-am in the older days connotes status - that the family is respectable and well-to-do. It is Celebrated every third week of March.

Philippine Eagle Sanctuary

The Philippine Eagle Foundation began its search of eagles in Apayao in 2011 after reports of huge eagles were roaming the area for centuries. On March 22, 2013, scientists discovered the stronghold of critically endangered Philippine eagles, the country's national bird, in Luzon island within the vicinity of the Calanasan Lowland Forest. In January 2015, the town of Calanasan initiated a program which protected 3,000 hectares of forests under its jurisdiction. Additionally, the province of Apayao is one of the very few in the country which has an approved forest land use plan (FLUP). The first active Philippine eagle nest in Apayao was discovered in July 2015.

On 9 July 2018, the provincial government of Apayao announced their intent for the province to be a UNESCO Biosphere Reserve. The province, which possesses more than 286,000 hectares of virgin forests, also noted that they have sent four of their personnel to train in the United States under the US Foreign Service to hasten the declaration of the site. On January 16, 2019, the provincial government announced that they are at the 'legwork for the inscription'.

See also
 List of renamed cities and municipalities in the Philippines

References

External links

 [ Philippine Standard Geographic Code]

Municipalities of Apayao